Jason Hughes (born 27 July 1969) is the owner-driver of the Kartworld Racing (also known as KWR) auto racing team, which has competed in the British Touring Car Championship from 2003 to 2008. In 1999 Hughes was BRSCC Fiesta Champion, and first entered the BTCC with a Nissan Primera in the Production Class.

Moving up into the main Touring Class for 2004 he raced in an MG ZS, finishing 17th. He did a partial season in 2005 (scoring enough points to come 13th overall in a smaller field), but returned to running the full schedule in 2006. For the second half of the season Hughes converted his MG to run on bioethanol instead of regular petrol, joining Fiona Leggate in using the alternative fuel. On 3 September 2006 Hughes took his best ever result of 4th, at Knockhill in Scotland.

Hughes continued to drive his bio-ethanol powered MG in 2007, with Leggate in a second car. The team were beset with problems but Hughes scored Overall points several times, with both cars scoring in the independents championship. In 2008 Hughes agreed to purchase a Honda Integra from veteran racer David Pinkney, but a sponsor failed to pay up, forcing him to continue with the MG, which received an engine upgrade midseason. He entered again in 2009, but missed the first two rounds while recovering from a knee operation. He later missed the rest of the season. Hughes again did not participate in the 2010 season.

Racing record

Complete British Touring Car Championship results
(key) (Races in bold indicate pole position – 1 point awarded in first race) (Races in italics indicate fastest lap – 1 point awarded all races) (* signifies that driver lead race for at least one lap – 1 point awarded all races)

External links
Profile at BTCCPages.com

British Touring Car Championship drivers
1969 births
Living people